Percy Bell (26 July 1892 – 4 February 1956) was an English cricketer. He played for Gloucestershire in 1911 and 1912, before moving to South Africa, playing in the Currie Cup for Orange Free State in the 1912/13 season.

References

1892 births
1956 deaths
English cricketers
Gloucestershire cricketers
Cricketers from Oxford
Free State cricketers
British emigrants to South Africa